KJQ may refer to:

KJQ (Stockton, California), an AM radio station licensed from 1921 to 1925.
KLO-FM, a Salt Lake City FM station which held the call letters KJQN from 2004 to 2012 and used the slogan "Classic Alternative KJQ".